The 2015 Nigerian Senate election in Gombe State was held on March 28, 2015, to elect members of the Nigerian Senate to represent Gombe State. Mohammed Danjuma Goje representing Gombe Central and Usman Bayero Nafada representing Gombe North won on the platform of All Progressives Congress, while Joshua Moltobok representing Gombe South won on the platform of Peoples Democratic Party.

Overview

Summary

Results

Gombe Central 
All Progressives Congress candidate Mohammed Danjuma Goje won the election, defeating People's Democratic Party candidate Usman Kumo and other party candidates.

Gombe North 
All Progressives Congress candidate Usman Bayero Nafada won the election, defeating People's Democratic Party candidate Abdulkadir Hamma and other party candidates.

Gombe South 
Peoples Democratic Party candidate Joshua Moltobok won the election, defeating All Progressives Congress candidate Adams Balah and other party candidates.

References 

Gombe State Senate elections
March 2015 events in Nigeria
Gom